HD 130084, also known as HR 5510, is a variable red giant star in the constellation Boötes. Located around 730 light-years distant, it shines with a luminosity approximately 569 times that of the Sun and has a surface temperature of 3854 K.

References

Boötes
130084
072124
M-type giants
5510
Suspected variables
Durchmusterung objects